Westside High School is the only high school of the Westside Community Schools district (also known as District 66 to local residents) of Omaha, Nebraska, United States.

Student life

Modular schedule system
Westside has used a modular schedule since 1967. Each module, or "mod" (as known colloquially among WHS students), is either a 20 or 40-minute period used for classes or independent study time in an instructional materials center (IMC). This allows freedom in scheduling as classes can be 40, 60, or 80 minutes long, as needed for one-to-one, small group, large group, and laboratory instruction. Classes are taught in a similar format to many universities; students typically meet a large group lecture once per week and have small group recitations throughout the week. An average student has at least one or two open mods per day, to be used for studying, interacting with teachers, eating lunch, or socializing. Students who have met specific requirements are eligible to apply for a pass that allows them to leave the building during open mods.

Supreme Court case
In 1985, Westside Senior Bridget Mergens was denied the ability to create an after-school Christian Bible club. The principal at the time rejected the idea since he said a religious club violated the First Amendment's Establishment Clause. In addition, the club lacked a school sponsor that was required when forming a club. Mergens argued that the district's decision was in violation of the federal Equal Access Act requiring that groups seeking to express messages containing “religious, political, philosophical, or other content” not be denied the ability to form clubs. The case was initially ruled in favor of the school by the District Court, being over turned in the Court of Appeals. The Supreme Court granted Westside certiorari, following appeal.

In 1990, Westside Community Board of Education v. Mergens was heard by the Supreme Court. In an 8–1 decision, the court said that since the club did not study school curriculum, it was permitted under the Equal Access Act. Supreme Court of the United States decided in favour of Mergens in Westside School District v. Mergens saying that in distinguishing between "curriculum" and "noncurriculum student groups," the Court held that since Westside permitted other noncurricular clubs, it was prohibited under the Equal Access Act from denying equal access to any after-school club based on the content of its speech. The proposed Christian club would be a noncurriculum group since no other course required students to become its members, its subject matter would not actually be taught in classes, it did not concern the school's cumulative body of courses, and its members would not receive academic credit for their participation. The Court added that the Equal Access Act was constitutional because it served an overriding secular purpose by prohibiting discrimination on the basis of philosophical, political, or other types of speech. As such, the Act protected the Christian club's formation even if its members engaged in religious discussions.

Extracurricular activities
Westside athletic teams have won the following state championships.

Notable alumni
 Kurt Andersen, writer
 Brad Ashford, U.S. Representative for Nebraska's 2nd congressional district (elected 2014)
 Bill Danenhauer, professional wrestler and football player/coach
 Clark Baechle, member of The Faint
 Todd Fink, member of The Faint
 Pat Fischer, professional football player (Washington Commanders)
 Channing Gibson, screenwriter 
 Bennett Greenspan, businessman and entrepreneur
 Tim Halperin, musician, and Top 24 American Idol contestant (2011)
 Nick Hexum, member of 311
 Michael J. Hopkins, mathematician
 Jaime King, actress and model
 Terry Kiser, actor
 Joseph Limprecht, United States Ambassador to Albania
 Nick Nolte (1959), actor
 Pete Ricketts, 40th governor of Nebraska; former Chief Operating Officer of TD Ameritrade
 Darin Ruf, professional baseball player, San Francisco Giants
 Dave Stryker, American Jazz Guitarist
 Virginia Lamp Thomas, lawyer and consultant
 Adeev and Ezra Potash, identical twin musicians and television personalities
 Jake Meyers, professional baseball player, Houston Astros
 William "Phil" McGauvran,"HIM", Founding Father of the "Heineken Boys"

References

External links
 District website

High schools in Omaha, Nebraska
Educational institutions established in 1951
Public high schools in Nebraska
1951 establishments in Nebraska